Clarence Barker Memorial Hospital is a historic hospital building located at Biltmore Village, Asheville, Buncombe County, North Carolina.  It was designed by architect Richard Sharp Smith and built in 1907. It is a -story, pebbledash finished building with a full-width verandah.

It was listed on the National Register of Historic Places in 1979. It was named after the late cousin of Biltmore Estate owner George Washington Vanderbilt II.

References

External links

Hospital buildings on the National Register of Historic Places in North Carolina
Hospital buildings completed in 1907
Buildings and structures in Asheville, North Carolina
National Register of Historic Places in Buncombe County, North Carolina